Manningham is a suburb in the inner north-eastern suburbs of Adelaide, the capital of South Australia. It is around 5 km from the city centre, in the City of Port Adelaide Enfield council area.

Manningham is bounded on the west by Hampstead Road and on the south by North East Road, Adelaide. The northern boundary is Muller Road and the eastern boundary is Ways Road.

See also
James Philcox, early land speculator who owned land in the area

References

Suburbs of Adelaide